The Baptista Lake titi monkey (Plecturocebus baptista) is a species of titi monkey, a type of New World monkey, endemic to Brazil. It was originally described as Callicebus baptista in 1939.

References

Baptista Lake titi
Mammals of Brazil
Endemic fauna of Brazil
Baptista Lake titi
Taxa named by Einar Lönnberg